Mustikkamaa (literally translates to "blueberry land") is an island in the Gulf of Finland, some  to the east of the city centre of Helsinki, and   in size.

Leisure use
It is owned by the City of Helsinki, and used for public recreational and leisure activities such as jogging, hiking, cross-country skiing, tennis and other ballgames.

There is an open-air summer theatre, restaurant and marina, and the island is connected via a pedestrian bridge to the adjacent island of Korkeasaari, where the Helsinki zoo is located.

Bridges
In 1964, a bridge was built to connect Mustikkamaa to the larger island of Kulosaari.

In 2016, the new Isoisänsilta bridge was opened, connecting Mustikkamaa also to the Kalasatama neighbourhood on the Helsinki mainland.

Thermal energy storage
In the 1980s, three large rock caverns were excavated under Mustikkamaa, to store oil reserves. In 2018, the Helsinki municipal energy company HELEN began converting these into a thermal energy storage facility, capable of holding  of warm ( or warmer) water, with the aim of reducing Helsinki's carbon emissions by over 20,000 tons annually.

References

Islands of Helsinki
Parks in Helsinki